Estudantes is a Brazilian musical comedy film directed by Wallace Downey and starring Carmen Miranda, Barbosa Júnior, Mesquitinha and Mário Reis.

Initially titled Folia de Estudantes,  this motion picture was shot entirely in a single week at the studios and labs of Cinédia. It premiered on July 8, 1935 at The Cine Alhambra, in Rio de Janeiro. It played in most theaters for two weeks. It was also shown in São Paulo, at Cine Odeon (Sala Vermelha), debuting on July 15 of that year. Viewed historically as a lost film, as of 2017, no prints of this motion picture are known to exist.

Plot 
Carmen Miranda, in her role as a radio singer named Mimi, is seen courted by three students.

Production 
The film was a co-production of Waldow Filmes and Cinédia studios, directed by Wallace Downey and based on a script by musicians João de Barro and Alberto Ribeiro. The setting is at a student residence within a university. The Mimi character was Carmen Miranda's  debut acting role on film. She also sings in the movie. The crooner romantically pursuing her is played by Mário Reis. Two other students, played by Mesquetinha and Bárbosa Júnior, also vie for her affections, giving rise to a wealth of comic incidents. Although the film's soundtrack featured well-known carnival "marchas" and sambas, it was not designed to tie in with any annual celebrations. The film was an example of so-called 'mid-year' productions (de meio de ano), the premieres of which were often timed to coincide with the 'festas juninas' or popular Catholic festivals held in June.

Inspired by the success of this film, other vehicles for carnival music, the 'mid-year' musicals, were created as publicity tools to promote the radio and record industries. "Estudantes" featured musical numbers associated with popular religious celebrations. The song 'Cadê Mimi?' (Where's Mimi?), performed by Mário Reis as he serenades Carmen Miranda's character,  subsequently became a huge hit throughout Brazil.

Cast 

 Carmen Miranda ... Mimi
 Barbosa Júnior ... Flores
 Mesquitinha ... Ramalhete
 Mário Reis ... Mário
 Almirante ... Himself
 Ivo Astolphi ... Himself (as Bando da Lua)
 Simão Boutman ... Himself
 Hervê Cordovil ... Himself
 Aloysio De Oliveira ... Himself (as Bando da Lua)
 Oswaldo de Moraes Eboli ... Himself (as Bando da Lua)
 Jaime Ferreira		
 Silva Filho		
 Adélia Fontes		
 Hélio Jordão ... Himself (as Bando da Lua)
 Benedito Lacerda ... Himself
 César Ladeira	... Locutor
 Nina Marina		
 Silvinha Melo	... Herself
 Aurora Miranda ... Herself
 Jorge Murad		
 Afonso Osório	... Himself (as Bando da Lua)
 Armando Osório ... Himself (as Bando da Lua)
 Stênio Osório	... Himself (as Bando da Lua)
 Carmem Silva ... Herself
 Sílvio Silva	... Teacher
 Haroldo Tapajós ... Himself (as Irmãos Tapajós)
 Paulo Tapajós	... Himself (as Irmãos Tapajós)
 Jeanette Weyting		
 Dulce Weytingh

Critical reception 
Estudantes received mixed reviews. An anonymous P. de L., writing for the Rio newspaper O Globo on 25 June 1935, called it a retrograde step in relation to "Alô, alô, Brasil!". Alfredo Sade, writing in the Rio-based publication A Batalha in July 1935, argued that Estudantes was a far superior film. He praised the quality of photography and the sound in what he termed this 'very Brazilian musical comedy'. Another anonymous review by a certain A. F. in the newspaper Diário Português of July 1935 argued that Estudantes's greatest value was its spontaneity and the promise that it and its young creators represented for the future of the cinema industry in Brazil. This potential was to be more fully realised in Cinédia's next production, Alô, Alô, Carnaval!.

Musical numbers 
 Linda Mimi ... Performed by Mário Reis
 Sonho de Papel ... Performed by Carmen Miranda
 E Bateu-se a Chapa ... Performed by Carmen Miranda
 Onde Está o Seu Carneirinho? ... Performed by Aurora Miranda
 Linda Ninon ... Performed by Aurora Miranda
 Ele ou Eu ... Performed by Silvinha Melo & Irmãos Tapajós
 Lulu ... Performed by Bando da Lua
 Assim Como o Rio ... Performed by Almirante

References

External links

1935 musical comedy films
1935 films
Brazilian musical comedy films
1930s Portuguese-language films
Lost Brazilian films
Cinédia films
Brazilian black-and-white films
1935 lost films